The Communauté de communes du Provinois is a federation of municipalities (communauté de communes) in the Seine-et-Marne département and in the Île-de-France région of France. Its seat is Provins. Its area is 628.5 km2, and its population was 34,587 in 2018, of which 12,000 in Provins.

Composition 
Since 2013, when it absorbed the former Communauté de communes de la GERBE and the commune Chalautre-la-Grande, the Communauté de communes du Provinois includes 39 communes:

Augers-en-Brie 
Bannost-Villegagnon
Beauchery-Saint-Martin
Beton-Bazoches
Bezalles
Boisdon
Cerneux
Chalautre-la-Grande
Chalautre-la-Petite
Champcenest
La Chapelle-Saint-Sulpice
Chenoise-Cucharmoy
Courchamp
Courtacon
Frétoy 
Jouy-le-Châtel
Léchelle
Longueville
Louan-Villegruis-Fontaine
Maison-Rouge
Les Marêts
Melz-sur-Seine
Montceaux-lès-Provins
Mortery
Poigny
Provins
Rouilly
Rupéreux
Saint-Brice
Sainte-Colombe
Saint-Hilliers
Saint-Loup-de-Naud
Saint-Martin-du-Boschet
Sancy-lès-Provins
Soisy-Bouy
Sourdun
Villiers-Saint-Georges
Voulton
Vulaines-lès-Provins

See also
Communes of the Seine-et-Marne department

References

Intercommunalities of Seine-et-Marne
Commune communities in France